Philip Glanville is a British Labour Party politician who currently serves as the directly elected mayor of Hackney in London.

Philip Glanville was elected Mayor of Hackney in September 2016, becoming the borough's second directly elected mayor following the resignation of the incumbent, Jules Pipe. He has supported several local community and trade union movements, most recently joining lecturers at Loughborough University London on the picket line to protest changes in university pension scheme.

He was previously a councillor in Hoxton for ten years, and spent three years as Cabinet Member for Housing before briefly becoming Deputy Mayor in 2016. He became civilly partnered to his husband Giles McCrary III, a native of Texas, in February 2011 and then was one of the first in the United Kingdom to convert his civil partnership into marriage at a midnight ceremony on 10 December 2014.

Glanville has acknowledged that more housing should be built to tackle London's growing housing crisis.

Glanville has lobbied to introduce 'curfews' for new nightlife venues, to manage the impact of late-night opening on local communities. This initiative has been launched in an attempt to "encourage new pubs and clubs to consider hard-working neighbours trying to get a good night's sleep", while also encouraging new business development in Hackney.

References

External links 
Mayoral website

Living people
Mayors of places in Greater London
Labour Party (UK) mayors
English LGBT politicians
LGBT mayors of places in the United Kingdom
Year of birth missing (living people)
People educated at King's School, Worcester